Guangyang Commandery, at times also Guangyang Principality, was a territory of early imperial China located in modern Hebei and Beijing.

Western Han dynasty
Guangyang Commandery was first established during Qin Shi Huang's reign. In early Han dynasty, its land became the fief of the Princes of Yan The commandery was restored in 80 BC, after Prince Dan (劉旦) of Yan's rebellion was suppressed. In 73 BC, Liu Jian, a son of Liu Dan, was granted the title Prince of Guangyang, and the commandery became his fief. 

Four princes held the title Prince of Guangyang:
Liu Jian (劉建), Prince Qing (頃) of Guangyang, 73–45 BC;
Liu Shun (劉舜), Prince Mu (穆) of Guangyang, 45–23 BC;
Liu Huang (劉璜), Prince Si (思) of Guangyang, 23–3 BC;
Liu Jia (劉嘉), 3 BC – 9 AD, deposed after the establishment of Xin dynasty.

The principality had a population of 70,658 in 2 AD, in 20,740 households. It consisted of four counties: Ji (薊), Fangcheng (方城), Guangyang (廣陽) and Yinxiang (陰鄉).

Eastern Han dynasty
The commandery was expanded, and administered five counties: Ji, Guangyang, Changping (昌平, formerly part of Shanggu Commandery), Jundu (軍都, formerly part of Shanggu) and Anci (安次, formerly part of Bohai Commandery). The seat, Ji, was also the seat of You Province. In 140 AD, the population was 280,600, in 44,550 households. With the beginning of the Three Kingdoms period, the commandery was abolished and merged into the Principality of Yan (燕國).

Northern Wei
Northern Wei established a commandery of the same name in 441 with three counties, Yanle (燕樂), Guangxing (廣興) and Fangcheng. The seat was Yanle, in present-day Longhua County, Hebei. The population was 8,919, and the households numbered 2,800. The commandery was abolished in Northern Qi.

See also
 History of Beijing
 Jicheng (Beijing)

References

Commanderies of the Qin dynasty
Commanderies of the Han dynasty